Lidcombe railway station is located on the Main Suburban line, serving the Sydney suburb of Lidcombe. It is served by Sydney Trains T1 Western, T2 Inner West & Leppington, T3 Bankstown and T7 Olympic line services.

History

Lidcombe station opened on 1 November 1858 as Haslams Creek Station after local landowner, Samuel Haslam. When in 1867 land was set aside for a cemetery nearby, the residents renamed the locality Rookwood. The official name of the station was changed in 1878. By the turn of the century the Necropolis was also called Rookwood, so on 1 January 1914 the station name was renamed again to Lidcombe.

On 11 November 1912, Lidcombe became a junction station, with the opening of a deviation of the Main South line to Regents Park.

On 23 April 1999, Platform 0 was opened as part of the Olympic Park line project. As part of this work, the station was refurbished and a second footbridge added at the eastern end.

In 2010, an extra dock platform for terminating City via Bankstown trains was opened. This was built as part of the CityRail Clearways Project which was intended to untangle the various lines and make the network simpler to operate. In conjunction with a companion project at Homebush, operation of the Bankstown line was separated from the Inner West & Leppington Line in October 2013. The changes resulted in the discontinuation of almost all trains to Liverpool via Regents Park prompting a community campaign to reinstate lost services.

Platforms & services
Lidcombe has six platforms: five for ordinary suburban services, and one for the shuttle between Lidcombe and Olympic Park – officially Platform 0 but known simply as the Olympic Park Sprint platform. During times of special events, some train services may make additional calls at Lidcombe.

Transport links
Transdev NSW operates three routes via Lidcombe station:
915: to University of Sydney Cumberland Campus (limited semester service)
925: to East Hills via the Botanica Estate and Bankstown 
M92: Parramatta station to Sutherland station

Transit Systems operates one route to and from Lidcombe station:
401: to Lidcombe Birnie Avenue loop service

Lidcombe station is served by three NightRide routes:
N50: Liverpool station to Town Hall station
N60: Fairfield station to Town Hall station
N61: Carlingford station to Town Hall station

Trackplan
The Lidcombe Junction trackplan includes the Lidcombe Triangle Loop with a direct bi-directional track between Auburn and Berala. The Lidcombe Triangle Loop is primarily used during trackwork as a diversion route for trains from the Western Line to connect with the Bankstown Line towards Sydney CBD.

References

External links

Lidcombe station details Transport for New South Wales
Lidcombe Station Public Transport Map Transport for NSW

Easy Access railway stations in Sydney
Railway stations in Sydney
Railway stations in Australia opened in 1858
Lidcombe, New South Wales
Main Southern railway line, New South Wales
Olympic Park railway line
Main Suburban railway line